Taraxacum hybernum, also known as Krim-Saghyz, or Autumn dandelion, is a perennial species of flowering plant in the family Asteraceae.  In dry spring it produces only a rosette of leaves. In the wild, it blooms in spring or autumn, depending on moisture conditions, as a cultivated plant it has been reported to have 2 flowerings in one season.

Distribution 
Taraxacum hybernum is commonly found in Southern Europe, the Balkans, Crimea, and Turkey.

Uses 
It has been researched in the Soviet Union as a source of latex for rubber production, with "very good results" and 800ha worth of plantations in both North Caucasus and South Caucasus (as of 1934).

See also 
 Taraxacum kok-saghyz
 Scorzonera tau-saghyz

References 

hybernum
Flora of Ukraine
Flora of the Crimean Peninsula
Flora of Bulgaria
Flora of European Turkey
Flora of Turkey
Plants described in 1856
Rubber